Spring Grove may refer to

Locations

United Kingdom
 Spring Grove, London
 Spring Grove, County Fermanagh, a townland in County Fermanagh, Northern Ireland

United States
 Spring Grove, Florida
 Spring Grove, Illinois
 Spring Grove, Indiana
 Spring Grove Hospital Center near Baltimore, Maryland
 Spring Grove, Minnesota
 Spring Grove Township, Minnesota
 Spring Grove, Missouri
 Spring Grove Township, Harlan County, Nebraska
 Spring Grove Historic District, Toledo, Ohio, listed on the NRHP in Ohio
 Spring Grove, Pennsylvania
 Spring Grove Borough Historic District, listed on the NRHP in Pennsylvania
 Spring Grove, Virginia
 Spring Grove (Mount Holly, Virginia), listed on the NRHP in Virginia
 Spring Grove (Oak Corner, Virginia), listed on the NRHP in Virginia
 Spring Grove, Wisconsin, a town
 Spring Grove, Green Lake County, Wisconsin, an unincorporated community

See also
 Spring Grove Cemetery (disambiguation)